Ted Sieger's Molly Monster (also known as Molly Monster: The Movie or simply Molly Monster) is a 2016 animated adventure fantasy film directed by Ted Sieger, Matthias Bruhn and Michael Ekbladh from a story by Sieger and screenplay by John Chambers, based on the titular children's TV series.

Release 
Ted Sieger's Molly Monster had its world premiere at the 66th Berlin International Film Festival on 15 February 2016, before being released theatrically in Germany on 8 September.

References

External links 
 (in German) 

Ted Sieger's Molly Monster at filmportal.de (in German)

2016 animated films
2016 films
2010s German animated films
2010s children's animated films
2010s children's adventure films
2010s German-language films
Animated films about dragons
German animated films
German children's adventure films
Swiss adventure films
Swiss animated films
Swedish animated films
Swedish adventure films
2010s German films
2010s Swedish films